{{Infobox album
| name       = Tierra Firme
| type       = studio
| artist     = Luis Fonsi
| cover      = TierraFirmealbum.jpg
| alt        =
| released   = 
| recorded   = 2010–2011
| studio     =
 Jet Wash Studios
 Studio 1203 (Miami Beach, Florida)
| genre      = Latin pop
| length     = 42:49
| label      = Universal Music Latino
| producer   = 
· Luis Fonsi
· Armando Ávila
· Dan Warner
· Lee Levin
· Louis Bianconcello
· Sam Watters
· Sebastián Krys
· Claudia Brant
| prev_title = Palabras del Silencio
| prev_year  = 2008
| next_title = 8
| next_year  = 2014
| misc       = 
}}
Tierra Firme is the eighth studio album recorded by Puerto Rican singer-songwriter Luis Fonsi. It was released by Universal Music Latino on June 28, 2011 (see 2011 in music).

Track listing
 "Explícame"
 "Respira"
 "Dime Que No"
 "Gritar"
 "Nunca Digas Siempre"
 "Me Gustas Tú"
 "Vuelve a Mi Lado"
 "El Anillo y La Flor"
 "Claridad"
 "Se Supone"
 "A Un Paso de Tenerte"
 "Víctima"
 "Renacer"
 "Gritar" (Mexican Regional Version)
 "Claridad" (Dance Remix)

Charts

Weekly charts

Year-end charts

Certifications

See also
List of number-one Billboard Latin Albums from the 2010s
List of number-one albums of 2011 (Spain)

References

2011 albums
Luis Fonsi albums
Universal Music Latino albums
Spanish-language albums
Albums produced by Sebastian Krys